The second season of the American comedy-drama television series Ugly Betty started on September 27, 2007, in the United States and Canada and including a long, mid-season hiatus ran until May 22, 2008. The second part of the season began airing April 24, 2008.

Due to the fan base gained in the United Kingdom, the show's British broadcaster Channel 4 bought the UK rights to season 2 so they could begin airing it only a week later than the US. Due to the Writer's Strike of 2007, Ugly Betty went on a hiatus in Britain after the airing of episode "Bananas for Betty" (Episode 10). Channel 4 announced that Ugly Betty would return towards the end of 2008. When it returned to British television on September 5, 2008, it received 2.93 million viewers (12.9% share), according to overnight figures, which is a strong figure for Channel 4. This season was originally set to last 20 episodes, but due to the 2007-08 Writers Guild of America strike, it was shortened to 18 episodes.

Season 2 was the last to be produced in Los Angeles before it was confirmed that the series would move to New York City to complement its setting in the next and last seasons.

Cast
All of the main cast from the show's first season returned for the second season, with the exception of Kevin Sussman (who had portrayed Walter). In addition, Christopher Gorham (Henry) and Judith Light (Claire) were promoted from guest star status to the main cast.

Starring
 America Ferrera as Betty Suarez
 Eric Mabius as Daniel Meade
 Alan Dale as Bradford Meade (episode 1–12)
 Rebecca Romijn as Alexis Meade
 Judith Light as Claire Meade
 Vanessa L. Williams as Wilhelmina Slater
 Becki Newton as Amanda Tanen
 Ana Ortiz as Hilda Suarez
 Ashley Jensen as Christina McKinney
 Tony Plana as Ignacio Suarez
 Michael Urie as Marc St. James
 Mark Indelicato as Justin Suarez
 Christopher Gorham as Henry Grubstick

Recurring roles
 Freddy Rodriguez as Gio Rossi
 Kevin Alejandro as	Santos
 Jayma Mays as Charlie
 Alec Mapa as Suzuki St. Pierre
 Lorraine Toussaint as Yoga
 David Blue as Cliff St. Paul
 Bailey Chase as Becks Scott
 Max Greenfield as Nick Pepper
 Rick Fox as Dwayne
 Lindsay Lohan as Kimmie Keegan
 Derek Riddell as Stuart
 Juliette Goglia as Hillary
 Gabrielle Union as Renee Slater
 Julian De La Celle as Daniel Meade Jr.

Guest stars
 Vera Wang as herself
 Victoria Beckham as herself
 Betty White as herself
 Gene Simmons as himself
 Christian Siriano as himself
 Nina Garcia as herself
 Larry King as himself
 Naomi Campbell as herself
 Roberta Myers as herself
 Joe Zee as	Himself

Advertising
Singer Mika contributed a track to the show. The song, "Big Girl (You Are Beautiful)", a top-10 single in the UK, was used as the promotional theme for the second season, but with altered lyrics to say "Hey Betty, you are beautiful" in the song's chorus, along with a music video featuring the cast. This was the second time a Mika song had been featured on Ugly Betty, with a remix of "Grace Kelly" having already featured in "Punch Out".

After four episodes of the second season of Ugly Betty had aired in Australia, the Seven Network noted that special guests Victoria Beckham, Lindsay Lohan and Naomi Campbell would be guest-starring in the near future. However, Australian viewers only saw Beckham and the others were not seen until the season finale aired. After several weeks, "Giving Up the Ghost" aired on July 2, 2008. Ugly Betty was then put on hiatus and the Seven Network announced they planned to show the rest of the episodes after the 2008 Summer Olympics. After only one episode, "Bananas for Betty", was shown on August 28, 2008, Ugly Betty was cancelled for no apparent reason. After several complaints for not finishing the season, the show went back to air on December 2, 2008, where it aired twice a week on Tuesdays and Thursdays, eventually only airing the show on Thursdays. The final episode aired on Thursday, January 15, 2009.

Episodes

Notes:

Season 2 was originally slated to have a total of 24 episodes, but due to the Writers Guild of America strike, it had 18 episodes with the last five written and produced following the strike's end.

DVD release

Walt Disney Studios Home Entertainment release of Ugly Betty Season Second, subtitled "Brighter, Bolder, Bettyer", would be September 9, 2008 in the United States and Canada. All 18 episodes were included in the set, along with additional bonus tracks.

Among the features:

On Set With The Besties
The Suarez Tour
Wihelmina Slater: Love to Hate Her
Las Pasiones De Telenovelas
I ♥ Betty
Bettly Bloops
Deleted Scenes

Ratings

United States

United Kingdom
Ugly Betty was aired on Channel 4 on a usual time of Fridays at 9.00pm. These figures are official ratings released by BARB.

a Ranks are for Channel 4 weekly, not for overall TV.

The gap between "Bananas for Betty" on December 14, 2007 and "Zero Worship" was taken for three reasons:

1. Channel 4 was originally scheduled to take a three-week break at Christmas and resume episodes in January; this hadn't happened.

2. The 2007–2008 WGA strike meant only three episodes were left after the last episode, so Channel 4 decided it was pointless to resume them for just a couple of weeks in late January unless there were no more episodes to be produced. The WGA strike was resolved in February, so Channel 4 had promised viewers the series would return later on in the year with new episodes, but had no idea of when to return them, as the next six months (February–August 2008) was already filled.

3. Channel 4 decided to wait until September after Big Brother 2008 had finished airing, as the episodes took up approximately 100 minutes of airtime on a Friday night, which filled Betty's slot. Prior to Big Brother, March–May was filled with the whole first season of Dirty Sexy Money, which occupied Betty's slot whenever it was not on, and moved accordingly. Betty made its return to Channel 4 on Friday 5 September 2008 between the two season finale episodes of Big Brother. Unlike Desperate Housewives' 3rd-season premiere, Betty's timeslot for that week was not changed as the first show finished at 9pm and resumed with episode 2 at 10pm, meaning that Betty could return to its normal slot. Episodes played straight through into season 3 without a break, and viewers who were desperate to see the next episode of the show could see it one night earlier on a Thursday instead of a Wednesday in its usual 9:00pm slot on E4. T4 then introduced weekend encore sessions on Sundays which replayed that week's episode from 1:30 pm–2:30pm.

Soundtrack
Despite never having a physical or digital release a soundtrack of the series. This music was used during the second season of the series.

"Quicksand Thievery" by Natalie Walker
"Golden Dreams" by Syd Straw
"Fire" by Arthur Brown
"Mile in These Shoes" by Jennifer Lopez
"Un-Break My Heart" by Toni Braxton
"Get'cha Head In the Game" by Zac Efron
"Makin' It" by David Naughton
"Heart of Glass" by Blondie
"Sigh" by Crowded House
"Dirty South Hustla" by Carolina Slim
"Left in the Dark" by The Leonards
"As Time Goes By" from the film Casablanca
"You Can't Have Me" by Clearlake
"Hot Sahara" by Jimmy Century
"Fantasy" by Julian Smith
"Defying Gravity" by Wicked Cast
"I'm Not That Girl" by Wicked Cast
"Popular" by Wicked Cast
"Milkshake" by Amanda Tanen
"Hallelujah" by Rufus Wainwright
"Ebony and Ivory" by Paul McCartney and Stevie Wonder
"You Sexy Thing" by Hot Chocolate
"Sometimes You Can't Make It On Your Own" by U2
"I'm in Love with a Girl" by Cynthia Felton
"Hernando's Hideaway" by From the album 'Tango – Music of Passion'
"Step It Up" by The Bamboos
"Eyes Wider Than Before" by Scott Matthews
"Arky, Arky (Rise and Shine – Noah)" by Anna Laura Page & Jean Anne Shaffeman
"If You Don't Know Me By Now" by Harold Melvin & the Blue Notes
"Rise and Shine" by Vanessa Williams
"Ice Cream Man" by Van Halen
"Dance Away the Day" by Blanche Dubois
"Can't Get Tired of Me" by Bow Wow
"Hey Baby (Jump Off)" by Bow Wow & Omarion
"Rock and Roll All Nite" by Betty Suarez
"The Girls" by Calvin Harris
"Drama Queen" by Switches
"Gene Simmons Is My Daddy" by Amanda Tanen and I.R.S
"Shout" by I.R.S
"Simply Irresistible" by I.R.S
"It Takes Two" by Betty Suarez and Henry
"In My Dreams" by Walter Meego
"Blister of the Spotlight" by Ashtar Command
"1st Movement String Quintet – Come Try Me" by Savourna Stevenson
"Never Enough" by Belinda
"Bounce with Me" by Kreesha Turner
"No One" by Alicia Keys
"Calabria" by Enur
"Didn't You Know (You'd Have to Cry Sometime)" by Gladys Knight & the Pips
"True" by Spandau Ballet
"Forever" by Walter Meego
"In Love with a Friend" by Deep Dish
"All By Myself" by Eric Carmen
"Boys Like My Beat" by Joniece
"All Night" by Joshua Tyler
"Brighton's Rock" by Shawn Lee's Ping Pong Orchestra
"Miles Away" by Madonna
"Jump" by Madonna
"Candy Shop" by Madonna
"Spanish Lesson" by Madonna
"Give It 2 Me" by Madonna
"She's Not Me" by Madonna

References and sources
From The Chicago Tribune July 25, 2007
From TV Guide (August 1, 2007)
From US Weekly (July 25, 2007)
People.com (August 6, 2007)
From TV Guide (July 11, 2007)
From E! Online (August 6, 2007)
From E Online (August 21, 2007)
From TV Guide (August 1, 2007)
From Zap2it (July 13, 2007)
From TV Guide (August 1, 2007)
From Televisionista.net (July 16, 2007)
From TV Guide (August 22, 2007)
From TV Guide (August 22, 2007)
From Television Without Pity messageboard
From The Futon Critic (August 6, 2007)
From E Online (August 21, 2007)
From Playbill.com (July 29, 2007)
From USA Today (August 15, 2007)
From Skyshowbiz.com (August 16, 2007)
From ET Online (August 28, 2007)
From E! Online (September 4, 2007)
From TV Squad (September 3, 2007)
From Black Voices (September 28, 2007)

Footnotes

See also
 List of minor characters on Ugly Betty

Ugly Betty
2007 American television seasons
2008 American television seasons